Pavo Barišić (born 9 September 1959) is a Croatian philosopher and politician who served as the Minister of Science and Education in the Cabinet of Andrej Plenković from 19 October 2016 until 9 June 2017. He publishes in the field of philosophy of law, politics and democracy, history of philosophy, and bioethics. He is a member of Croatian Democratic Union.

Biography

Pavo Barišić graduated from the University of Zagreb, its Faculty of Law in 1982, and its Faculty of Humanities and Social Sciences in 1983. He gained a PhD degree from the University of Augsburg in 1989 with the dissertation Welt und Ethos [World and Ethos].

Since 1986, he has been a research fellow at the Institute of Philosophy in Zagreb, and its director between 1991 and 2001. He was a full professor at the University of Split, where he was head of the Department of Philosophy from 2005 to 2013. From 2019 he is a full professor at the University of Zagreb and from 10 December 2019 to 16 March 2021 was a dean of Faculty of Croatian Studies.

He was an editor-in-chief of the leading Croatian and international philosophical journals Filozofska istraživanja and Synthesis Philosophica. From 2007 to 2009, he was a president of the Croatian Philosophical Society.

From 2014 until 2016 he was a president of the Croatian Humboldt Club, and from 2021 the vice president. For 13 years, from 2003 to 2016, he was the president of the Croatian Paneuropean Union, and since 2015 he has been the Secretary General of the International Pan-European Union.

In 2002–2003, he was a visiting professor at the Kwansei Gakuin University in Nishinomiya, Japan, where, together with Hideki Mine and Masakatsu Fujita, he prepared a thematic issue on Philosophy in Japan.

In 2015, Barišić received the award for scientific excellence from the Institute of Philosophy. In 2018, he received the Recognition of the Humboldt Foundation for research and international collaboration, and a special Recognition from the Rector of the university for his contribution and promotion of the University of Split. In 2022, he was awarded for scientific works with high international visibility at the University of Zagreb, Faculty of Croatian Studies.

As deputy minister at the Ministry of Science, Education and Sports from 2004 to 2006, he was the Head of the Operational Staff for the Implementation of the Bologna Reform and the First President of the Steering Board of the Agency for Science and Higher Education. On 19 October 2016 he was appointed as the Minister of Science and Education in the Cabinet of Andrej Plenković.

His mandate ended on 9 June 2017, when the government coalition was reshuffled and his Ministry of Science and Education was entrusted to the Croatian People's Party. According to the coalition agreement, Barišić was offered the position of a minister at the Ministry of Labour and Pension System in exchange, which he declined. Two months later, asked by reporters if he was sorry that Barišić was no longer a minister, the Prime Minister Andrej Plenković explained that it was the professor's decision and that he was offered a ministerial position in the new parliamentary majority: „He could have been the minister if he wanted. In the configuration of the new parliamentary majority, he had the opportunity to be a minister in the government. He thanked, but he has my support. We are in communication.“

In May 2021, Barišić has been elected as ordinary member of the European Academy of Science and Arts, which has its headquarters in Salzburg, Austria.

Philosophy

World and Ethos 
The main topic of the book Welt und Ethos (1992) is Hegel's attitude towards the sundown of the occidental spiritual development. It analyses the turning point from the pinnacle of the absolute idealism to the nihilistic eclipse of the European metaphysics. In focus of its reconsideration is the concept of the world as ethos of the man, his whereabouts, abode, domicile, home, ecumene, the inhabited earth. It sheds light on Hegel's re-narration of the teleological order of events in the world history.

The book finishes with a famous parable on the spirit as a seed. Through this comparison, the ambiguous and dialectical nature of Hegel's view emerges into the broad daylight: "He has proved that the western spiritual life has attained its ripeness. After that, the ripened seed has to fall off, decay and decline. However, Hegel's position differs substantially from the nihilism that followed it; thus, he does not consider only one side of the completion of the spirit in the world. The development does not end in the sheer ruination of the thousands years’ work of the spirit in the world. From the ripened fruit arises a new seed, a new principle and life."

Erwin Hufnagel explains that this study "propounds all substantial parts of Hegel's philosophy" and "takes into consideration the relevant secondary literature with a rare systematic potency and impressive capability of differentiation".

Ethical Ideal of Democracy 
In the thematic issue on Democracy and Political Education, edited on the 150th anniversary of John Dewey, Barišić highlights two key moral criteria "that in a special way point to the superiority of the educational ideal in a democratic community over any other form of social integration. First, there is the level of common interest that is realised in a society. The second principle is that of freedom to develop new common and individual interests in various forms of association."

The main question is whether the ethical ideal of humanity could be applied as a philosophical basis for the evaluation and justification of democratic practices. The study considers that Dewey's advocacy of strengthening the moral and participative democracy links in local communities was the reason why his model of democracy has found its way into the communitarian discourse. Dewey does not destroy the foundations of liberalism and democracy by emphasising the substantial communication-community-common connection, but rather enriches, strengthens, and takes the same to a higher level.

Deliberative Democracy 
In his essay on Aristotle's Thinking of the Many and Deliberation, Barišić argues against the elitist theory of democracy. His standpoint is that, through the process of deliberation, a group of people acquire a new quality; they become a unity and a community. When citizens get together to deliberate and make common decisions upon thoughtful consideration, they reach a cognitive and moral level which is higher than the level of a minority of experts and honourable individuals, the so-called elite, regardless of their individually achieved perfections.

Barišić elaborates five arguments of Aristotle's in favour of the democratic deliberation of the multitude: political, ethical, dianoetic, teleological, and collective responsibility. He concludes that Aristotle brought to light fundamental arguments on deliberation and the advantages of the rule of the many that are, in some way, still valid today. Politics is neither a mere procedure (Rawls) nor a purely a rational discourse (Habermas). It is practical wisdom, judgment, and a matter of deliberation and pooling by the many.

The Ideal of the Rule of the People 
In his book The Ideal of the Rule of the People, Barišić reconsiders certain significant stations of the historical sailing of the ship of democracy. His central reflections are devoted to contemporary straits, cliffs and storms that democracy is facing at different meridians. Particular attention is paid to global perspectives and projections of advantages and perils that the democracy vessel is to expect in the future.

Barišić argues that the great story of the rule of the people in the world has not ended yet. It continues indeed, with democracy thus being regenerated and rejuvenated. "It has not withered in ‘post-democracy’. Irrespective of all the deficiencies and shortcomings which are observable in political acting, the crucial goals which politics aspires to pursue in achieving freedom, equality, justice, human rights and the common good are something that makes politics precious and noble. The democratic path to these objectives is shorter and safer than others."

Cosmopolitan Democracy 
The book on Cosmopolitan Democracy, edited with Henning Ottmann, rounds out their trilogy on the contemporary issues of the “rule by the people”. In his reconsideration of the “scope and aporias of cosmopolitan democracy”, Barišić comes to the final verdict that the idea of cosmopolitan democracy is a noble-hearted vision that, for the time being, contains a “flaw” of appropriate realization in the present realpolitik. On the other hand, he argues for the unique historical project of the European Union as one of the successful attempts to transfer the content of human rights protection on the transnational level.

Publications
 Dijalektika običajnosti [The Dialectics of Social Morality]. Zagreb 1988.
 Welt und Ethos [World and Ethos]. Würzburg: Königshausen & Neumann 1992.
 Filozofija prava Ante Starčevića [The Philosophy of Law of Ante Starčević]. Zagreb 1996.
Metafizika ćudoređa [Metaphysics of Morals]. Immanuel Kant. Ed. Introduction. [Transl. by Dražen Karaman]. Zagreb: Matica Hrvatska 1999.
 Otvorena pitanja povijesti hrvatske filozofije [Open Issues of the History of the Croatian Philosophy]. Ed. Zagreb 2000.
 Demokracija i etika [Democracy and Ethics]. Ed. Zagreb 2005.
 Demokracija na prekretnici [Democracy at Crossroads]. Ed. Zagreb 2014.
 Deliberative Demokratie [Deliberative Democracy]. Ed. with Henning Ottmann. Baden-Baden: Nomos 2015.
 Ideal vladavine puka. Uvod u filozofiju demokracije [The Ideal of the Rule of the People. Introduction to the Philosophy of Democracy]. Zagreb/Split 2016.
 Demokratie und Öffentlichkeit [Democracy and the Public]. Ed. with Henning Ottmann. Baden-Baden: Nomos 2016.
Kosmopolitische Demokratie [Cosmopolitan Democracy]. Ed. with Henning Ottmann. Baden-Baden: Nomos 2018.

References

External links
Personal webpage

1959 births
Living people
Croatian Democratic Union politicians
Croatian philosophers